Lois Brako (born  July 25, 1957) is an American botanist, mycologist and explorer. She has conducted botanical expeditions in Peru.

Publications

Articles 
 -----------; AW Meerow; L. Brako. 1993. New combinations in Hippeastrum, Ismene, and Leptochiton (Amaryllidaceae) for the flora of Peru. Novon 3: 28–30
 -----------. Inga (Fabaceae), Plantaginaceae, Rosaceae, Sapindaceae. In: L. Brako & J. L. Zarucchi (eds.), Catalogue of the Flowering Plants & Gymnosperms of Peru. Monogr. Syst. Bot. Missouri Bot. Gard. 45: 481–486, 923–925, 1003–1010, 1059–1068. 1993

Books 
 1981. The lichens of Wabasha and Winona counties, Minnesota. Ed. University of Minnesota. 278 pp.
 1987. The lichen genus Phyllopsora (Bacidiaceae) in the neotropics. Ed. City University of New York. 532 pp.
 1991. Phyllopsora (Bacidiaceae). Number 55 Flora neotropica. Ed. Organization for Flora Neotropica by the New York Botanical Garden. 66 pp. 
 1993. Catalogue of the flowering plants and gymnosperms of Peru: Catálogo de las angiospermas y gimnospermas del Perú. Number 45 Monographs in systematic botany from the Missouri Botanical Garden. 1.286 pp. 
 -----------, Amy Y. Rossman, David F. Farr. 1995. Scientific and common names of 7,000 vascular plants in the United States. U.S. National Fungus Collections. Number 7 Contributions from the U.S. National Fungus Collections. 295 pp.

References

Sources 
 Harvard Botanist Index: Lois Brako

21st-century American botanists
1950 births
Living people